KODK 90.7 FM is a public radio station licensed to Kodiak, Alaska. The station is owned by Kodiak Public Broadcasting Corporation.

References

External links
KODK's website

Public radio stations in the United States
ODK